The 2016 U-20 Copa Libertadores was the 3rd edition of the U-20 Copa Libertadores, South America's premier under-20 club football tournament organized by CONMEBOL. The tournament, which returned after a four-year hiatus having been temporarily discontinued since 2012, was held in the cities of Asunción and Luque, Paraguay, from 30 January to 14 February 2016.

Teams
The competition was contested by 12 teams: the title holder, the champion club from each of the ten CONMEBOL member associations, and one additional team from the host association Paraguay.

Players must be born on or after 1 January 1996. However, each team may include a maximum of five players born on or after 1 January 1995.

Venues
The tournament was played in four venues in two cities, all in the Metropolitan Area of Asunción:
Estadio Defensores del Chaco, Asunción
Estadio Dr. Nicolás Léoz, Asunción (home stadium of Club Libertad)
Estadio Manuel Ferreira, Asunción (home stadium of Club Olimpia)
Estadio Feliciano Cáceres, Luque (home stadium of Sportivo Luqueño)

Group stage
The draw of the tournament was held on 15 January 2016, 12:00 local time, at the headquarters of the Paraguayan Football Association in Asunción. For the group stage, the 12 teams were drawn into three groups of four. The two teams from Paraguay (Cerro Porteño and Libertad) and the title holder (River Plate) were seeded.

In the group stage, the teams were ranked according to points (3 points for a win, 1 point for a draw, 0 points for a loss). If tied on points, tiebreakers were applied in the following order:
Goal difference in all games;
Goals scored in all games;
Head-to-head result in games between tied teams;
Penalty shoot-out (between two teams playing against each other in the last match of the group)
Drawing of lots.

The winners of each group and the best runner-up among all groups advanced to the knockout stage.

All times local, PYST (UTC−3).

Group A

Group B

Group C

Ranking of second-placed teams

Knockout stage
In the knockout stage, the winners of the semi-finals (Group A winner vs. Group C winner; Group B winner vs. Best runner-up) advanced to the final, while the losers played in the third place match. If tied after regulation time, the penalty shoot-out was used to determine the winner (no extra time was played).

Bracket

Semi-finals

Third place match

Final

Final standings

References

External links
Copa Libertadores Sub20 2016, CONMEBOL.com

2016
U-20
2016 in youth association football
2016 in South American football
2016 in Paraguayan football
International club association football competitions hosted by Paraguay